Graeme Schnell  (born 7 May 1988 in Calgary), is a Canadian professional squash player. He won the  Mount Royal University Open twice, in 2016 and 2020. He has represented Canada internationally.

References

Living people
Canadian male squash players
Sportspeople from Calgary
1988 births
Pan American Games medalists in squash
Pan American Games gold medalists for Canada
Pan American Games silver medalists for Canada
Squash players at the 2015 Pan American Games
Medalists at the 2015 Pan American Games
21st-century Canadian people